Henri Théophile Hildibrand (19 June 1824, Paris - 13 August 1897, Pacy-sur-Eure) was a French wood-engraver; primarily for the firms of Hetzel and Hachette.

Life and work 
He studied engraving at the "Atelier ABL", founded in 1832 by Jean Best (1808–1879), Isidore Leloir (born c.1803) and the British wood-engraver, John Andrew, to create vignettes for Le Magasin pittoresque.

At that time, he became one of the best known translators of the works of Gustave Doré and a master of colored engraving.

In 1845, he was one of a group of engravers that composed over 200 illustrations for "Mysteries of the Inquisition, and other secret societies of Spain" by "Victor De Féréal" (a pseudonym). Published by Boizard, it became a great success and a bit of a scandal.

He also worked with the publishing firm of Hetzel; notably on illustrations for the novels of Jules Verne.

Some of his works also appeared in periodicals, such as Le Tour du monde, where many of his wood-engravings were based on photographs (via drawings); notably those of Émile Gsell.

 References

 Further reading 
 Dictionnaire critique et documentaire des peintres, sculpteurs, dessinateurs & graveurs de tous les temps et de tous les pays; Vol. 2; Emmanuel Bénézit; 1924  page 612.
 Rémi Blachon, La Gravure sur bois au XIXe siècle'', Paris, Les éditions de l'amateur, 2001.

External links 

1824 births
1897 deaths
French engravers
French illustrators
Artists from Paris